Goldilocks Bakeshop is a bakery chain based in the Philippines, which produces and distributes Philippine cakes and pastries.

History

On May 15, 1966, Filipino-Chinese sisters, Milagros Leelin Yee and Clarita Leelin Go, and their sister-in-law Doris Wilson Leelin, opened the first Goldilocks store on a  space on the ground floor of a three-story building along Pasong Tamo Street in Makati and started with only 10 employees.

In 1976, Goldilocks opened its first store in the United States in Los Angeles. In 1991, Goldilocks launched a franchising program which led to the opening of hundreds of Goldilocks' store in Metro Manila.

Other stores were later set up in other parts of California such as San Francisco, San Jose, and in Las Vegas, Nevada.

Pancake House International planned to acquire Goldilocks Bakeshop, but negotiations to acquire the bakeshop chain fell in 2006.

Branch locations
In 2019,  it was reported that there are at least 400 full-service stores in the Philippines, 6 in Thailand, 10 in California and 1 in Nevada, United States, and 2 in Canada.

Brand image
Goldilocks Bakeshop was named after Goldilocks, a character from the fairy tale Goldilocks and the Three Bears to make the name of the chain easier to remember by children and their mothers. The name also suggests the words "gold" and "luck" which was viewed to be auspicious by the founders. The naming was suggested by the founders' sister Maria Flor.

In 2010, Goldilocks underwent a full re-branding.

See also
List of bakeries

References

External links

 Official website

Bakery cafés
Fast-food chains of the Philippines
1966 establishments in the Philippines
Companies based in Mandaluyong
Restaurants established in 1966